Dossier Criminal (DC) is a term used extensively in the Indian Police forces for the classification of criminals. A dossier criminal is a person who has committed specific crimes across police circles or sub-divisions. In most cases, a DC would have already been in the Known Depredator (K.D) list maintained at every police station as part of the Station Diary.

References

Law enforcement in India